This is a list of promotional activities by The Coca-Cola Company.

List 
 Ashita Ga Arusa
 Coke Zero Facial Profiler
 Coming Together
 Country Sunshine
 Diet Coke Break
 H2NO
 Hey Kid, Catch!
 I'd Like to Teach the World to Sing
 The Lost Island of Alanna
 MagiCan
 Max Headroom
 Move to the Beat
 My Coke Rewards
 MyCoke
 Once Upon a Wheel
 Open Happiness
 Pepsi Invaders
 The Polar Bears
 Share a Coke

See also 
 List of Coca-Cola slogans

Coca-Cola
Food marketing
Advertising campaigns